These are the Billboard Hot Dance Club Play number-one hits of 1980.

See also
1980 in music
List of number-one dance hits (United States)
List of artists who reached number one on the U.S. Dance chart

References

Some weeks may also be found at Billboard magazine courtesy of Google Books: 1980—1984.

1980
1980 record charts
1980 in American music